Innova may refer to:
 Innova Capital Partners, an American investment firm
 Innova Discs, a disc golf disc manufacturer
 Innova Disc Golf (video game)
 Innova Junior College, Woodlands, Singapore
 Innova Recordings, a record label
 Toyota Innova, a multi-purpose vehicle/minivan
 Honda Wave series or Innova, motorcycle models
 Innova (album), by Fireflight
 Innova (video game company), Russia

See also 
 Inova Health System